The 1983 All-Pacific-10 Conference football team consists of American football players chosen by various organizations for All-Pacific-10 Conference teams for the 1983 college football season.

Offensive selections

Quarterbacks
 Steve Pelluer, Washington

Running backs
 Kevin Nelson, UCLA
 Bryce Oglesby, Oregon St.
Kerry Porter, Washington St.

Wide receivers
 Mike Sherrard, UCLA
 Brad Anderson, Arizona

Tight ends
 Paul Bergmann, UCLA

Tackles
Duval Love, UCLA
 Dan Lynch,  Washington St.

Guards
Gary Zimmerman, Oregon
 Rick Mallory, Washington

Centers
Tony Slaton, USC

Defensive selections

Linemen
 Keith Millard, Washington St.
 Ron Holmes, Washington
Dan Ralph, Oregon
Eric Williams, Washington St.

Linebackers
Ron Rivera, California
Ricky Hunley, Arizona
Jack Del Rio, USC
Neal Dellocono, UCLA

Defensive backs
 Don Rogers, UCLA
Lupe Sanchez, UCLA
Randy Robbins, Arizona
David Fulcher, Arizona St.

Special teams

Placekickers
Luis Zendejas, Arizona St.

Punters
 Kevin Hicks, Oregon

Return specialists 
Lew Barnes, Oregon

Key

See also
1983 College Football All-America Team

References

All-Pacific-10 Conference Football Team
All-Pac-12 Conference football teams